The seventh season of the long-running Australian outback drama McLeod's Daughters began airing on 7 February 2007 and concluded on 17 October 2007 with a total of 32 episodes.

Plot
Jodi's world is turned upside down when Matt suddenly reappears, forcing her to choose between Matt and Riley, a decision that could have deadly consequences. Kate returns following a mysterious twist of events. The wild-at-heart Grace Kingston arrives having inherited part of the Drover's Run, and faces the challenge of a reconciliation with her estranged sister, Regan. Alex finally meets his half-brother, Marcus. Tayler struggles to fit in at Drover's Run. Alex attempts to pop the question to Stevie, with a series of disastrous consequences, while Stevie is forced to face her own personal demons.

Cast

Main 
 Simmone Jade Mackinnon as Stevie Hall (28 episodes)
 Rachael Carpani as Jodi Fountain (8 episodes)
 Abi Tucker as Grace Kingston (24 episodes)
 Matt Passmore as Marcus Turner (31 episodes)
 Aaron Jeffery as Alex Ryan (21 episodes)
 Michala Banas as Kate Manfredi (26 episodes)
 Gillian Alexy as Tayler Geddes
 Luke Jacobz as Patrick Brewer
 Dustin Clare as Riley Ward
 Zoe Naylor as Regan McLeod (14 episodes)
 Doris Younane as Moira Doyle

Recurring 
 Peter Hardy as Phil Rakich (19 episodes)
 Sandy Winton as Heath Barrett (15 episodes)
 Sam Healy as Ashleigh Redstaff (13 episodes)
 Jonny Pasvolsky as Matt Bosnich (8 episodes)
 Craig Stott as Jamie Mitchell (7 episodes)
 Basia A'Hern as Rose Hall Smith (5 episodes)
 John Stanton as Bryce Redstaff (5 episodes)
 Rachael Coopes as Ingrid Marr (3 episodes)

Guest 
 Carmel Johnson as Beth Martin (4 episodes)
 Reece Horner as Nat (4 episodes)
 Patrick Frost as Neil Thompson (3 episodes)
 Callan Mulvey as Mitch Wahlberg (3 episodes)
 Genevieve Picot as Helen Hall (2 episodes)
 Rebecca Hall as Dana Rivers (2 episodes)
 Sonia Todd as Meg Fountain (1 episode)
 Jay Laga'aia as Gabriel (1 episode)
 Trudy Hellier as Barbara Geddes (1 episode)
 Josef Ber as Hugh McLeod (1 episode)

Notes

Episodes

Reception

Ratings
On average, the seventh season of McLeod's Daughters was watched by 1.18 million viewers, down 10% and 130,000 viewers from the previous season. It was the 4th most-watched Australian drama of 2007, behind City Homicide, All Saints and Home and Away respectively, and ranked at #11 for its seventh season.

{{Australian television episode ratings
| backgroundcolour = 

| hidetimeslot = yes
| hideCON      = yes
| unit         = 

| title1       = Second Chances
| date1        = 7 February 2007
| OVviewers1   = 1,181,000
| OVrank1      = 9
| ref1         = 

| title2       = All the Wrong Places
| date2        = 14 February 2007
| OVviewers2   = 1,148,000
| OVrank2      = 7
| ref2         = 

| title3       = Digging Up the Past
| date3        = 21 February 2007
| OVviewers3   = 1,146,000
| OVrank3      = 7
| ref3         = 

| title4       = Thicker Than Water
| date4        = 28 February 2007
| OVviewers4   = 1,166,000
| OVrank4      = 9
| ref4         = 

| title5       = Reaching Out
| date5        = 7 March 2007
| OVviewers5   = 1,213,000
| OVrank5      = 6
| ref5         = 

| title6       = Returned Favour
| date6        = 14 March 2007
| OVviewers6   = 1,321,000
| OVrank6      = 2
| ref6         = 

| title7       = Of Hearts and Hunters
| date7        = 21 March 2007
| OVviewers7   = 1,320,000
| OVrank7      = 3
| ref7         = 

| title8       = Climb Every Mountain
| date8        = 11 April 2007
| OVviewers8   = 1,333,000
| OVrank8      = 2
| ref8         = 

| title9       = Sisters Are Doing it for Themselves
| date9        = 18 April 2007
| OVviewers9   = 1,243,000
| OVrank9      = 4
| ref9         = 

| title10      = Rules of Engagement
| date10       = 25 April 2007
| OVviewers10  = 1,355,000
| OVrank10     = 6
| ref10        = 

| title11      = Bloodlines
| date11       = 2 May 2007
| OVviewers11  = 1,242,000
| OVrank11     = 5
| ref11        = 

| title12      = Warts and All
| date12       = 9 May 2007
| OVviewers12  = 1,184,000
| OVrank12     = 10
| ref12        = 

| title13      = Conflict of Interests
| date13       = 16 May 2007
| OVviewers13  = 1,184,000
| OVrank13     = 10
| ref13        = 

| title14      = Flesh and Stone
| date14       = 30 May 2007
| OVviewers14  = 1,282,000
| OVrank14     = 6
| ref14        = 

| title15      = All's Fair in Love and War| date15       = 6 June 2007
| OVviewers15  = 1,289,000
| OVrank15     = 9
| ref15        = 

| title16      = Ever After
| date16       = 20 June 2007
| OVviewers16  = 1,401,000
| OVrank16     = 4
| ref16        = 

| title17       = Grace Under Fire
| date17        = 27 June 2007
| OVviewers17   = 1,262,000
| OVrank17      = 7
| ref17         = 

| title18       = Gift Horse
| date18        = 11 July 2007
| OVviewers18   = 1,083,000
| OVrank18      = 15
| ref18         = 

| title19      = Hot Water
| date19       = 18 July 2007
| OVviewers19  = 1,122,000
| OVrank19     = 14
| ref19        = 

| title20      = Leaving the Nest
| date20       = 25 July 2007
| OVviewers20  = 1,156,000
| OVrank20     = 11
| ref20        = 

| title21      = A Spark from Heaven
| date21       = 1 August 2007
| OVviewers21  = 1,205,000
| OVrank21     = 8
| ref21        = 

| title22      = The Courage Within
| date22       = 8 August 2007
| OVviewers22  = 1,072,000
| OVrank22     = 12
| ref22        = 

| title23      = Divided We Stand
| date23       = 15 August 2007
| OVviewers23  = 1,083,000
| OVrank23     = 12
| ref23        = 

| title24      = On the Prowl
| date24       = 22 August 2007
| OVviewers24  = 1,072,000
| OVrank24     = 13
| ref24        = 

| title25      = Fanning the Flames
| date25       = 29 August 2007
| OVviewers25  = 989,000
| OVrank25     = 14
| ref25        = 

| title26     = My Enemy, My Friend
| date26       = 5 September 2007
| OVviewers26  = 1,078,000
| OVrank26     = 14
| ref26        = 

| title27      = Knight in Shining Armor
| date27       = 12 September 2007
| OVviewers27  = 1,181,000
| OVrank27     = 8
| ref27        = 

| title28      = The Short Cut
| date28       = 19 September 2007
| OVviewers28  = 1,094,000
| OVrank28     = 13
| ref28        = 

| title29      = Seeing is Believing
| date29       = 26 September 2007
| OVviewers29  = 937,000
| OVrank29     = 16
| ref29        = 

| title30      = Second Chances
| date30       = 3 October 2007
| OVviewers30  = 1,008,000
| OVrank30     = 16
| ref30        = 

| title31      = Mixed Messages
| date31       = 10 October 2007
| OVviewers31  = 1,076,000
| OVrank31     = 16
| ref31        = 

| title32      = Silent Night
| date32       = 17 October 2007
| OVviewers32  = 1,207,000
| OVrank32     = 9
| ref32        = 
}}

Award nominations
The seventh season of McLeod's Daughters'' received two nominations at the 2008 Logie Awards.
 Logie Award for Most Popular Actress (Simmone Jade Mackinnon)
 Logie Award for Most Popular Drama Series

Home media

References

 www.tv.com

External links
 McLeod's Daughters Official Website

McLeod's Daughters seasons
2007 Australian television seasons